The 1920 United States House of Representatives elections in Virginia were held on November 2, 1920 to determine who will represent the Commonwealth of Virginia in the United States House of Representatives. Virginia had ten seats in the House, apportioned according to the 1910 United States Census. Representatives are elected for two-year terms.

Overview

References

See also
 United States House elections, 1920

Virginia
1920
1920 Virginia elections